William Ray Lefear (born February 12, 1950) is a former American football running back and wide receiver in the National Football League who played for the Cleveland Browns. He played college football for the Henderson State Reddies.

Billy Lefear is married to Marilyn Lott Lefear, and has three children.

References

1950 births
Living people
American football running backs
American football wide receivers
American football return specialists
Cleveland Browns players
Henderson State Reddies football players